Groton Nature Center is a nature center in Groton, Vermont that serves seven area state parks located in Groton State Forest. Natural history exhibits focus on the forest's animals, plants, geology and ecosystems, including Lake Groton. Other exhibits include logging in the forest. The center offers naturalist programs, hikes and concerts. Visitors can obtain maps and trail guides for the parks and forest.

The Center is within walking distance of Big Deer State Park, Stillwater State Park and Boulder Beach State Park. The other parks in Groton State Forest are Kettle Pond State Park, New Discovery State Park, Ricker Pond State Park and Seyon Lodge State Park.

Groton Nature Center is operated by the Vermont Department of Forests, Parks, and Recreation, as part of the Vermont State Park system.

References

External links
Official website

Nature centers in Vermont
Buildings and structures in Groton, Vermont
Education in Caledonia County, Vermont
Tourist attractions in Caledonia County, Vermont